Henry II of Bar in French Henri II de Bar, in German Heinrich II von Bar (1190–13 November 1239) was a Count of Bar who reigned from 1214 to 1239. He was son of Count Theobald I of Bar and his first wife, Ermesinde of Bar-sur-Seine. Henry was killed on 13 November 1239 during the Barons' Crusade, when he diverted several hundred crusaders from the main army under Theobald I of Navarre to fight an Ayyubid force at Gaza.

Spouse and children
In 1219 he married Philippa de Dreux (1192–1242), the daughter of Robert II of Dreux.

Children
 Margaret of Bar (1220–1275), in 1240 she married Henry V of Luxembourg
 Thiébaut II of Bar (c. 1221–1291), Succeeded his father as Count of Bar
 Henry, 1249
 Jeanne (1225–1299), married first Frédéric de Blamont who died in 1255, and second Louis V, Count of Chiny
 Renaud (died 1271)

See also
Umm al-Naser Mosque

References

Sources

Counts of Bar
House of Montbelliard
Christians of the Barons' Crusade
1190 births
1239 deaths